Oilville may refer to:

Oilville, Virginia, an unincorporated community in Goochland County
Oilville, West Virginia, an unincorporated community in Logan County